is a Japanese company formed in October 2005 from the merger of Mitsubishi Chemical Corporation and Mitsubishi Pharma Corporation. The company is based in Tokyo and is one of the core Mitsubishi companies.

History
On December 4, 2021, the company announced they would be leaving the commodity chemical businesses by the 2023 fiscal year. The petrochemical and coal-chemical units accounted for $4.8 billion a year in sales and they said the reason for divesting is Japan's shift toward carbon neutrality and poor growth potential.

References

External links

 

 
Companies listed on the Tokyo Stock Exchange
Companies listed on the Osaka Exchange
Mitsubishi companies
Japanese companies established in 2005
Holding companies established in 2005
Holding companies based in Tokyo